The Battle of Manupur was fought between the Mughal Empire and the Durrani Empire in March 1748 near Sirhind which ended in victory for the Mughals.

Background

Following the assassination of Nader Shah, last Emperor of the Persian Afsharid dynasty, Ahmad Shah Durrani took control of Persian Afghanistan. In late 1747, he began operations against the declining Mughal Empire, taking Kabul, Peshawar, and, on 18 January 1748, Lahore. By February 1748, a Mughal army under Prince Ahmad Shah Bahadur and Qamaruddin Khan, the Subahdar of Lahore province, had assembled and was moving to drive out the Durrani army. On 1 March 1748, Ahmad Shah began searching for the Mughal army, making contact with them on 10 March outside the village of Manupur. On the same time, the Rajput army of Jaipur under Ishvari Singh assembled near Manupur.

Battle
When the Mughal commander, Qamaruddin Khan, was killed by artillery in an early exchange of fire, his son, Moin-ul-Mulk, also known as Mir Mannu, continued the battle. Ahmad Shah's Afghan troops swept aside the Rajput flank and raided their baggage train but a fire beginning in a captured rocket cart went on to ignite the Durrani artillery store, roasting thousands of soldiers alive and forcing Ahmad Shah Durrani's retreat.

Aftermath
After the retreat of Durrani, the panicked Mughal were unable to pursue, however Sikh bands under Charat Singh, Jassa Singh Ahluwalia and Ala Singh continued to harass them as they retreated to Kabul. Thus, the first invasion of Shah proved a failure but it gave an opportunity to the Sikhs to organize themselves into Dal Khalsa, an army of Sikh Confederacy, at Amritsar in March 1748.

References

Manupur 1748
Manupur 1748
1748 in Asia
Manupur 1748
1740s in the Durrani Empire